The Liberal Christian Democrats Union is a political party in the Democratic Republic of the Congo based in Kinshasa and is led by Raymond Tshibanda.

References

Political parties in the Democratic Republic of the Congo
Christian democratic parties in Africa